Abel was an American rock band from Poughkeepsie, New York. The band primarily played alternative rock and indie rock music, with soul music influences. The band began making music in 2008, and disbanded in 2013. Membership consisted of vocalist/guitarist Kevin Kneifel, guitarist Dan Bishop, bassist Alex David, and drummer John Rell III. The band released an extended play, The Honest Love, in 2009, through Dreamt Music. Their first studio album, Lesser Men, was released by Come&Live! Records, in 2010. Their final studio album, Make It Right, was released independently in 2012.

Background
Abel was an American rock band from Poughkeepsie, New York. Their members included vocalist/guitarist Kevin Kneifel, guitarist Dan Bishop, bassist Alex David, and drummer John Rell III.

Music history
The band formed in 2008, with their first release, The Honest Love, an extended play, released by Dreamt Music on September 1, 2009. They released a studio album, Lesser Men, on October 19, 2010 with Come&Live Records. Their final studio album, Make It Right, was released independently on September 18, 2012.

Members
Line-up
 Kevin Kneifel - vocals, guitar
 Dan Bishop - guitar
 Alex David - bass
 John Rell III - drums

Discography
Studio albums
 Lesser Men (October 19, 2010, Come&Live!)
 Make It Right (September 18, 2012, Independent)
EPs
 The Honest Love (September 1, 2009, Dreamt Music)

References

External links
 
 Cross Rhythms artist profile

Musical groups from New York (state)
2008 establishments in New York (state)
2013 disestablishments in New York (state)
Musical groups established in 2008
Musical groups disestablished in 2013
Facedown Records artists